In enzymology, a tetrahydroxypteridine cycloisomerase is an enzyme that catalyzes the chemical reaction

tetrahydroxypteridine  xanthine-8-carboxylate

Hence, this enzyme has one substrate, tetrahydroxypteridine, and one product, xanthine-8-carboxylate.

This enzyme belongs to the family of isomerases, specifically the class of intramolecular lyases.  The systematic name of this enzyme class is tetrahydroxypteridine lyase (isomerizing). It employs one cofactor, NAD+.

References 

 

EC 5.5.1
NADH-dependent enzymes
Enzymes of unknown structure